Karla Martínez (born May 11, 1976) is a Mexican TV show hostess. She is best known for hosting the show Control from 2000 to 2006 where she took over the show after Lesley Ann Machado's departure. She is currently a co-host on the popular morning show Despierta América on the Univision Network.

Martínez graduated from the University of Texas at El Paso with a degree in electronic media.
She began her career at KINT-TV, Univision's El Paso, Texas affiliate, in 1995.

In 2002, People en Español named Martínez one of its 25 Most Beautiful People.

References

1976 births
Living people
Mexican television presenters
Mexican women television presenters
People from Ciudad Juárez
People from El Paso, Texas
University of Texas at El Paso alumni
Mexican emigrants to the United States